The following is a list of paintings by Michaelina Wautier that are generally accepted as autograph by the Katlijne Van der Stighelen catalog and other sources.

Sources
 Exhibition website by Museum aan de Stroom
Michaelina Wautier (1614–1689), catalog and 2018 art exhibition in Antwerp, by Katlijne Van der Stighelen, 2018. Handbook for exhibition
 RKD record for Michaelina Wautier
 BALat record for Michaelina Wautier in Royal Institute for Cultural Heritage

References

Wautier